Vladas Jankauskas may refer to:

 Vladas Jankauskas (painter) (1923–83), Lithuanian painter
 Vladas Jankauskas (cyclist) (1903–69), Lithuanian cyclist